Ectoedemia psarodes is a moth of the family Nepticulidae. It was described by Vári in 1963. It is known from South Africa (it was described from the Soutpansberg District in Transvaal).

The larvae feed on Maytenus undatus.

References

Endemic moths of South Africa
Nepticulidae
Moths of Africa
Moths described in 1963